Tangen Station is a railway station located in Tangen in Stange, Norway on Dovre Line. The station was opened in 1880 with the construction of the railway between Eidsvoll and Hamar. Tangen is only served by regional trains by Vy

External links 
</

Railway stations on the Dovre Line
Railway stations in Hedmark
Railway stations opened in 1880
1880 establishments in Norway